Planariidae is a family of freshwater planarians.

The type genus is Planaria Müller, 1776.

Genera 
Twelve genera of Planariidae are known:
 Atrioplanaria
 Bdellasimilis
 Crenobia
 Digonoporus
 Hymanella
 Ijimia
 Paraplanaria
 Phagocata
 Plagnolia
 Planaria
 Polycelis
 Seidlia

Phylogeny 
Phylogenetic supertree after Sluys et al., 2009:

References 

Continenticola
Taxa named by William Stimpson
Platyhelminthes families